The 1966 Cincinnati Reds season consisted of the Reds finishing in seventh place in the National League with a record of 76–84, 18 games behind the NL Champion Los Angeles Dodgers.  The Reds were managed by Don Heffner (37–46) and Dave Bristol (39–38), who replaced Heffner in mid-July.

Offseason 
 December 9, 1965: Frank Robinson was traded by the Reds to the Baltimore Orioles for Milt Pappas, Jack Baldschun, and Dick Simpson.

Regular season

Season standings

Record vs. opponents

Notable transactions 
 April 4, 1966: Marty Keough was purchased from the Reds by the Atlanta Braves.
 June 7, 1966: Gary Nolan was drafted by the Reds in the 1st round (13th pick) of the 1966 Major League Baseball draft.

Roster

Player stats

Batting

Starters by position 
Note: Pos = Position; G = Games played; AB = At bats; H = Hits; Avg. = Batting average; HR = Home runs; RBI = Runs batted in

Other batters 
Note: G = Games played; AB = At bats; H = Hits; Avg. = Batting average; HR = Home runs; RBI = Runs batted in

Pitching

Starting pitchers 
Note: G = Games pitched; IP = Innings pitched; W = Wins; L = Losses; ERA = Earned run average; SO = Strikeouts

Other pitchers 
Note: G = Games pitched; IP = Innings pitched; W = Wins; L = Losses; ERA = Earned run average; SO = Strikeouts

Relief pitchers 
Note: G = Games pitched; W = Wins; L = Losses; SV = Saves; ERA = Earned run average; SO = Strikeouts

Farm system

Notes

References 
1966 Cincinnati Reds season at Baseball Reference

Cincinnati Reds seasons
Cincinnati Reds season
Cincinnati Reds